Caldara is a surname. Notable people with the surname include:
Antonio Caldara (1670–1736), Italian composer
Domenico Caldara (1814–1897), Italian painter
Emilio Caldara (1868–1942), Italian Socialist Party politician
Jon Caldara, American libertarian activist
Mattia Caldara (born 1994), Italian footballer
Orme Caldara (1875–1925), American stage actor
Polidoro Caldara, Italian painter
Renzo Caldara (born 1943), Italian bobsledder